The term "home front" covers the activities of the civilians in a nation at war. World War II was a total war; homeland military production became even more invaluable to both the Allied and Axis powers. Life on the home front during World War II was a significant part of the war effort for all participants and had a major impact on the outcome of the war. Governments became involved with new issues such as rationing, manpower allocation, home defense, evacuation in the face of air raids, and response to occupation by an enemy power. The morale and psychology of the people responded to leadership and propaganda. Typically women were mobilized to an unprecedented degree.

All of the powers used lessons from their experiences on the home front during World War I. Their success in mobilizing economic output was a major factor in supporting combat operations. Among morale-boosting activities that also benefited combat efforts, the home front engaged in a variety of scrap drives for materials crucial to the war effort such as metal, rubber, and rags.  Such drives helped strengthen civilian morale and support for the war effort. Each country tried to suppress negative or defeatist rumors.
The major powers devoted 50–61 percent of their total GDP to munitions production. The Allies produced about three times as much in munitions as the Axis powers.

Source: Goldsmith data in Harrison (1988) p. 172

Source: Jerome B Cohen, Japan's Economy in War and Reconstruction (1949) p 354

Allies

The Allies called themselves the "United Nations" (even before that organization formed in 1945), and pledged their support to the Atlantic Charter of 1941. The Charter stated the ideal goals of the war: no territorial aggrandizement; no territorial changes made against the wishes of the people; restoration of self-government to those deprived of it; free access to raw materials; reduction of trade restrictions; global cooperation to secure better economic and social conditions for all; freedom from fear and want; freedom of the seas; and abandonment of the use of force, as well as the disarmament of aggressor nations.

Belgium

The sudden German invasion of neutral Belgium in May 1940 led in a matter of 18 days to the collapse of the Belgian army; King Leopold obtained an armistice that involved direct German military administration. The King refused the government's demand that he flee with them to Britain; he remained as a puppet ruler under German control. The Belgian bureaucracy remained in place and generally cooperated with the German rulers. Two pro-German movements, the Flemish National Union comprising Flemish (Dutch-speaking) separatists and the Walloon (French-speaking) Rexists led by Léon Degrelle (1906–94), supported the invaders and encouraged their young men to volunteer for the German army. Small but active resistance movements, largely Communist, provided intelligence to the Allies. During the Holocaust in Belgium, the Nazis hunted down the 70,000 Jews living in Belgium, most of them refugees, and killed 29,000 of them.

The Germans expected to exploit Belgium's industrial resources to support their war machine. Their policies created severe shortages for the Belgian people, but shipped out far less than Germany had expected. They set up the "Armaments Inspection Board" in 1940 to relay munitions orders to factories; the Board came under the control of the German Minister of Armaments, Albert Speer in 1943, and had offices in industrial areas that were supposed to facilitate orders for materiél, and supervise production. However, factory production fell sharply after 1942. Although collaboration with the Nazis, especially among the Flemish, was evident in 1940, it soon faded in importance. Labor strikes and systematic sabotage slowed production, as did the emigration of workers to rural areas, Allied bombing, food shortages, and worker resentment of forced labor.

The Allies retook all of Belgium in September 1944 as the Germans retreated. They reappeared briefly during the hard fighting of the Battle of the Bulge in December 1944, but were finally expelled in January 1945. The London‐based government‐in‐exile returned, but had to confront the resistance movements that demanded radical political change.

China

China suffered the second highest number of casualties of the entire war. Civilians in the occupied territories had to endure many large-scale massacres, including that in Nanjing, Jiangsu and Pingdingshan, Liaoning. In a few areas, the Japanese army also unleashed newly developed biological weapons on Chinese civilians, leading to an estimated 200,000 dead. Tens of thousands died when Kuomintang (Nationalist) troops broke the levees of the Yangtze to stop the Japanese advance after the loss of the Chinese capital, Nanjing. Millions more Chinese died because of famine during the war.

At the end of the war Japan was bombed with two atomic bombs and surrendered. Japan had captured major coastal cities like Shanghai early in the war, cutting the rest of China off from its chief sources of finance and industry. Millions of Chinese moved to remote western regions to avoid invasion. Cities like Kunming ballooned with new arrivals. Entire factories and universities were relocated to safe areas so society could still function. Japan replied with hundreds of air raids on the new capital, Chongqing.

Although China received much aid from the United States, China did not have sufficient infrastructure to properly arm or even feed its military forces, let alone its civilians.

China was divided into three zones, with the Nationalists led by Chiang Kai-shek(Chiang or Jiang) the southwest and the Communists led by Mao Zedong (Mao) in control of much of the northwest. Coastal areas were occupied by the Japanese, and civilians were treated harshly; some young men were drafted into the puppet Chinese army.

France

After the stunningly quick defeat in June 1940, France was knocked out of the war; part of it, with its capital in Vichy, became an informal ally of the Germans. A powerful Resistance movement sprang up, as the Germans fortified the coast against an Allied invasion and occupied the northern half of the country. The Germans captured 2,000,000 French soldiers, and kept them as prisoners of war in camps inside of Germany for the duration of the war, using them as hostages to guarantee French cooperation. The Vichy French government cooperated closely with the Germans, sending food, machinery and workers to Germany. Several hundred thousand Frenchmen and women were forced to work in German factories, or volunteered to do so, as the French economy itself deteriorated. Nevertheless, there was a strong Resistance movement, with fierce anti-resistance activities carried out by the Nazis and the French police. Most Jews were rounded up by the Vichy police and handed over to the Germans, who sent them to death camps.

War wives
The two million French soldiers held as POWs and forced laborers in Germany throughout the war were not at risk of death in combat, but the anxieties of separation for their 800,000 wives were high. The government provided a modest allowance, but one in ten became prostitutes to support their families. Meanwhile, the Vichy regime promoted a highly traditional model of female roles. After the war, France gave women the vote and additional legal and political rights, although nothing on the scale of the enfranchisement that followed World War I.

Food shortages of the home front
Women suffered shortages of all varieties of consumer goods and the absence of the men in POW camps. The rationing system was stringent and very badly managed, leading to pronounced malnourishment, black markets and hostility to state management of the food supply. The Germans seized about 20% of the French food production, which caused severe disruption to the household economy of the French people. French farm production fell by half because of the lack of fuel, fertilizer and workers; even so, the Germans seized half the meat and 20% of the produce.

Supply problems quickly affected French stores, which lacked most items. The government responded by rationing, but German officials set the policies and hunger prevailed, especially affecting young people in urban areas. In shops, the queues lengthened. Some people—including German soldiers who could take advantage of arbitrary exchange rates that favored Germany—benefited from the black market, where food was sold without coupons at very high prices. Farmers diverted meat to the black market, so there was much less for the open market. Counterfeit food coupons were also in circulation. Direct buying from farmers in the countryside and barter against cigarettes became common. These activities were strictly forbidden, and carried the risk of confiscation and fines. Food shortages were most acute in the large cities. Vitamin deficiencies and malnutrition were prevalent.

Advice about eating a healthier diet and home growing produce was distributed. Slogans like "Digging for Victory" and "Make Do and Mend" appeared on national posters and became a part of the war effort. The city environment made these efforts nearly negligible. In the more remote country villages, however, clandestine slaughtering, vegetable gardens and the availability of milk products permitted survival. The official ration provided starvation-level diets of 1,300 or fewer calories a day (5400 kJ), supplemented by home gardens and, especially, black market purchases.

Netherlands

The Dutch famine of 1944, known as the Hongerwinter ("Hunger winter") was a man-made famine imposed by Germany in the occupied western provinces during the winter of 1944–1945. A German blockade cut off food and fuel shipments from farm areas. A total of 4.5 million people were affected, of whom 18,000 died, despite an elaborate system of emergency soup kitchens.

Poland

Food deprivation as a Nazi weapon
The Nazi Hunger Plan was to kill the Jews of Poland quickly, and slowly to force the Poles to leave by threat of starvation, so that they could be replaced by German settlers. The Nazis coerced Poles to work in Germany by providing favorable food rations for families who had members working in the Reich. The ethnic German population in Poland (Volksdeutsche) were given good rations and were allowed to shop for food in special stores. The German occupiers created a draconian system of food controls, including severe penalties for the omnipresent black market. There was a sharp increase in mortality due to the general malnutrition, and a decline in birth rates.

By mid 1941, the German minority in Poland received 2,613 calories (11,000 kJ) per day, while Poles received 699 and Jews in the ghetto 184. The Jewish ration fulfilled just 7.5% of their daily needs; Polish rations only 26%. Only the ration allocated to Germans provided the full required calorie intake.

Distribution of food in Nazi occupied Poland as of December 1941

Additionally the Generalplan Ost of the Nazis, which envisioned the elimination of the Slavic population in the occupied territories and artificial famines-as proposed in the Hunger Plan, were to be used.

Jews in the Warsaw Ghetto: 1943
On September 1, 1939, Germany invaded Poland, conquering it in three weeks, as the Soviets invaded the eastern areas. During the German occupation, there were two distinct civilian uprisings in Warsaw, one in 1943, the other in 1944. The first took place in a zone less than two square miles (5 km2) in area, which the Germans had carved out of the city and called Ghetto Warschau. The Germans built high walls around the ghetto, and crowded 550,000 Polish Jews into it, many from the Polish provinces. At first, people were allowed to enter and leave the ghetto, but soon its border became an "iron curtain".

Unless on official business, Jews could not leave, and non-Jews, including Germans, could not enter. Entry points were guarded by German soldiers. Because of extreme conditions and hunger, mortality in the ghetto was high. In 1942, the Germans moved 400,000 ghetto residents to Treblinka where they were gassed on arrival. By April 19, 1943, when the Ghetto Uprising commenced, the population of the ghetto had dwindled to 60,000 individuals. In the following three weeks, virtually all died as the Germans fought and systematically destroyed the buildings in the ghetto.

Warsaw Uprising of 1944
The uprising by Poles began on August 1, 1944, when the Polish underground, the "Home Army", aware that the Soviet Army had reached the eastern bank of the Vistula, sought to liberate Warsaw much as the French resistance had liberated Paris a few weeks earlier. Joseph Stalin had his own group of Communist leaders for the new Poland and did not want the Home Army or its leaders (based in London) to control Warsaw. So he halted the Soviet offensive and gave the Germans free rein to suppress it. During the ensuing 63 days, 250,000 Poles of the Home Army surrendered to the Germans. After the Germans forced all the surviving population to leave the city, Hitler ordered that any buildings left standing be dynamited – 98 percent of the buildings in Warsaw were destroyed.

Soviet Union

During the invasion of the Soviet Union in the early months of the war, rapid German advances almost captured the cities of Moscow and Leningrad. The bulk of Soviet industry which could not be evacuated was either destroyed or lost due to German occupation. Agricultural production was interrupted, with grain crops left standing in the fields. This caused hunger reminiscent of the early 1930s. In one of the greatest feats of war logistics, factories were evacuated on an enormous scale, with 1,523 factories dismantled and shipped eastwards along four principal routes to the Caucasus, Central Asia, the Ural, and Siberia. In general, the tools, dies and production technology were moved, along with the blueprints and their management, engineering staffs and skilled labor.

The whole of the Soviet Union became dedicated to the war effort. The people of the Soviet Union were probably better prepared than any other nation involved in World War II to endure the material hardships of the war, primarily because they were so used to shortages and economic crisis in the past, especially during wartime (World War I had brought similar restrictions on food). Conditions were nevertheless severe. World War II was especially devastating to citizens of the USSR because it was fought on Soviet territory and caused massive destruction. In Leningrad, under German siege, over a million people died of starvation and disease. Many factory workers were teenagers, women and old people.

The government implemented rationing in 1941 and first applied it to bread, flour, cereal, pasta, butter, margarine, vegetable oil, meat, fish, sugar and confectionery all across the country. The rations remained largely stable during the war. Off-ration food was often so expensive that it could not add substantially to a citizen's food supply unless they were especially well-paid. Peasants received no rations and had to make do with any local resources they farmed themselves. Most rural peasants struggled and lived in unbearable poverty, but others sold their surplus food at a high price; a few became rouble millionaires, until a currency reform two years after the end of the war wiped out their wealth.

Despite harsh conditions, the war led to a spike in Soviet nationalism and unity. Soviet propaganda toned down extreme Communist rhetoric of the past as the people now rallied to protect their Motherland against the evils of the German invaders. Ethnic minorities thought to be collaborators were forced into exile. Religion, which was previously shunned, became a part of a Communist Party propaganda campaign to mobilize religious people.

Soviet society changed drastically during the war. There was a burst of marriages in June and July 1941 between people about to be separated by the war, and in the next few years the marriage rate dropped off steeply, with the birth rate following shortly thereafter to only about half of what it would have been in peacetime. For this reason mothers with several children during the war received substantial honors and money benefits if they had several children—mothers could earn around 1,300 rubles for having their fourth child and up to 5,000 rubles for their tenth.

Survival in Leningrad
The city of Leningrad endured more suffering and hardships than any other city in the Soviet Union during World War II. Hunger, malnutrition, disease, starvation, and even cannibalism became common during the siege, which lasted from September 1941 until January 1944. Many people lost weight, and grew weaker and more vulnerable to disease. If malnutrition persisted for long enough, its effects were irreversible. People's feelings of loyalty disappeared if they got hungry enough; they would steal from their closest family members in order to survive.

Only some of the citizens of Leningrad survived. Only 400,000 were evacuated before the siege began; this left 4.5 million in Leningrad, including 700,000 children. Subsequently, more managed to escape; especially when the nearby Lake Ladoga froze over and people could walk over the ice road—or "road of life"—to safety. Those in influential political or social positions used their connections to other elites to leave Leningrad both before and after the siege began. Some factory owners even looted state funds to secure transport out of the city during the first summer of the war. The most risky means of escape, however, was to defect to the enemy and hope to avoid governmental punishment.

Most survival strategies during the siege, though, involved staying within the city and facing the problems through resourcefulness or luck: for instance by securing factory employment, because many factories became autonomous and possessed more of the requirements for survival during the winter, such as food and heat. Workers received larger rations than other civilians, and factories were likely to have electricity if they produced vital goods. Factories also served as mutual support centers, and had clinics and other services like cleaning crews and teams of women who would sew and repair clothes. Factory employees were still driven to desperation on occasion and people resorted to eating glue or horsemeat in factories where food was scarce, but factory employment was the most consistently successful method of survival, and at some food production plants not a single person died.

Survival opportunities open to the wider Soviet community included barter and farming on private land. Black markets thrived as private barter and trade became more common, especially between soldiers and civilians. Soldiers, who had more food to spare, were eager to trade with civilians who had extra warm clothes to exchange. Planting vegetable gardens in the spring became popular, primarily because citizens could keep everything grown on their own plots. The campaign also had a potent psychological effect and boosted morale, a survival component almost as crucial as bread.

Many of the most desperate Soviet citizens turned to crime to support themselves. Most common was the theft of food and of ration cards; this could prove fatal for a malnourished person if their card was stolen more than a day or two before a new card was issued. For these reasons, the stealing of food was severely punished and a person could be shot for as little as stealing a loaf of bread. More serious crimes such as murder and cannibalism also occurred, and special police squads were set up to combat these crimes, though by the end of the siege, roughly 1,500 had been arrested for cannibalism.

United States

In the United States, farming and other production was increased. For example, citizens were encouraged to plant "victory gardens", personal farms that children sometimes worked on. Sociologist Alecea Standlee (2010) argues that during the war the traditional gender division of labor changed somewhat, as the "home" or domestic female sphere expanded to include the "home front"; meanwhile the public sphere—the male domain—was redefined as the international stage of military action.

The Philippines

The Philippines was an American possession on the way to independence (scheduled in 1946) and controlled its own internal affairs. The Japanese invaded and quickly conquered the islands in early 1942. The Japanese military authorities immediately began organizing a new government structure in the Philippines and established the Philippine Executive Commission. They initially organized a Council of State, through which they directed civil affairs until October 1943, when they declared the Philippines an independent republic. The Japanese-sponsored Second Philippine Republic headed by President José P. Laurel proved to be ineffective and unpopular as Japan maintained very tight controls.

Japanese occupation of the Philippines was opposed by large-scale underground and guerrilla activity. The Philippine Army, as well as remnants of the U.S. Army Forces Far East continued to fight the Japanese in a guerrilla war. They formed an auxiliary unit of the United States Army. Their effectiveness was such that by the end of the war, Japan controlled only twelve of the forty-eight provinces. One element of resistance in the Central Luzon area was furnished by the Hukbalahap, which armed some 30,000 people and extended their control over much of Luzon. The Allies as well as the combined American and Filipino soldiers invaded in 1944–45; the battle for Manila was contested street by street with large numbers of civilians killed.

As in most occupied countries, crime, looting, corruption, and black markets were endemic. With a view of building up the economic base of the Greater East Asia Co-Prosperity Sphere, the Japanese Army envisioned using the islands as a source of agricultural products needed by its industry. For example, Japan had a surplus of sugar from Taiwan, and a severe shortage of cotton, so they try to grow cotton on sugar lands with disastrous results. They lacked the seeds, pesticides, and technical skills to grow cotton. Jobless farm workers flock to the cities, where there was minimal relief and few jobs.

The Japanese Army also tried using cane sugar for fuel, castor beans and copra for oil, derris for quinine, cotton for uniforms, and abaca (hemp) for rope. The plans were very difficult to implement in the face of limited skills, collapsed international markets, bad weather, and transportation shortages. The program was a failure that gave very little help to Japanese industry, and diverted resources needed for food production. As Karnow reports, Filipinos "rapidly learned as well that 'co-prosperity' meant servitude to Japan's economic requirements."

Living conditions were bad throughout the Philippines during the war. Transportation between the islands was difficult because of lack of fuel. Food was in very short supply, with sporadic famines and epidemic diseases.

The Japanese tried to remove all Western and American cultural influences. They met fierce resistance when they tried to undermine the Catholic Church by arresting 500 Christian missionaries. The Filipinos came to feel morally superior to the brutal Japanese and rejected their advances. Newspapers and the media were tightly censored. The Japanese tried to reshape schools and impose the Japanese language. They formed neighborhood associations to inform on the opposition.

Britain and Commonwealth
Conscription was the main means for raising forces in Britain and the dominions. This was a reversal of policy from 1914, when too many men who were vitally needed on the home front volunteered for the military.

Britain

Britain's total mobilisation during this period proved to be successful in winning the war, by maintaining strong support from public opinion. The war was a "people's war" that enlarged democratic aspirations and produced promises of a postwar welfare state.

Munitions
In mid-1940, the Royal Air Force (RAF) was called on to fight the Battle of Britain, but suffered serious losses. It lost 458 aircraft in France—more than current production— and was hard pressed. The government decided to concentrate on only five types of aircraft in order to optimise output. They were: Wellingtons, Whitley Vs, Blenheims, Hurricanes and Spitfires. These aircraft received extraordinary priority, which covered the supply of materials and equipment and even made it possible to divert from other types the necessary parts, equipment, materials and manufacturing resources. Labour was moved from other aircraft work to factories engaged on the specified types. Cost was no object. The delivery of new fighters rose from 256 in April to 467 in September—more than enough to cover the losses—and Fighter Command emerged triumphantly from the Battle of Britain in October with more aircraft than it had possessed at the beginning. Starting in 1941, the US provided munitions through Lend-Lease that totalled $15.5 billion

Rationing

Food, clothing, petrol, leather and other items were rationed. Perishable items such as fruit were not rationed. Access to luxuries was severely restricted, although there was also a significant black market. Families also grew "victory gardens", and small home vegetable gardens. Many goods were conserved to turn into weapons later, such as fat for nitroglycerin production. People in the countryside were less affected by rationing as they had greater access to locally sourced unrationed products than people in cities, and were more able to grow their own.

The rationing system, which was originally based on a specific basket of goods for each consumer, was much improved by switching to a points system which allowed housewives to make choices based on their own priorities. Food rationing also permitted the upgrading of the quality of the food available, and housewives approved—except for the absence of white bread and the government's imposition of an unpalatable wheat meal "national loaf". Surveys of public opinion showed that most Britons were pleased that rationing brought equality and a guarantee of a decent meal at an affordable cost.

Evacuation
From very early in the war, it was thought that the major industrial cities of Britain, especially London, would come under Luftwaffe air attack; this did happen in The Blitz. Some children were sent to Canada, the US and Australia, and millions of children and some mothers were evacuated from London and other major cities to safer parts of the country when the war began, under government plans for the evacuation of civilians, but they often filtered back. When the Blitz bombing began on September 6, 1940, they evacuated again. The discovery of the poor health and hygiene of evacuees was a shock to many Britons, and helped prepare the way for the Beveridge Report. Children were evacuated if their parents agreed; but in some cases they had no choice. The children were only allowed to take a few things with them, including a gas mask, books, money, clothes, ration book and some small toys.

Welfare state

An Emergency Hospital Service was established at the beginning of the war, in the expectation that it would be required to deal with large numbers of casualties.

A common theme called for an expansion of the welfare state as a reward to the people for their wartime sacrifices. This was set out in a famous report by William Beveridge. It recommended that the various forms of assistance that had grown up piecemeal since 1911 be rationalised. Unemployment benefits and sickness benefits were to be universal. There would be new benefits for maternity. The old-age pension system would be revised and expanded, and require that a person retired. A full-scale National Health Service would provide free medical care for everyone. All the major political parties endorsed the principles, and they were largely put into effect when peace returned.

Memory
The themes of equality and sacrifice were dominant during the war, and in the memory of the war. Historian Jose Harris points out that the war was seen at the time and by a generation of writers as a period of outstanding national unity and social solidarity. There was little antiwar sentiment during or after the war. Furthermore, Britain turned more toward the collective welfare state during the war, expanding it in the late 1940s and reaching a broad consensus supporting it across party lines. By the 1970s and 1980s, however, historians were exploring the subtle elements of continuing diversity and conflict in society during the war period. For example, at first historians emphasized that strikes became illegal in July 1940, and no trade union called one during the war. Later historians pointed to the many localised unofficial strikes, especially in coal mining, shipbuilding, the metal trades and engineering, with as many as 3.7 million man days lost in 1944.

The BBC collected 47,000 wartime recollections and 15,000 images in 2003-6 and put them online. The CD audiobook Home Front 1939–45 also contains a selection of period interviews and actuality recordings.

Canada

Canada joined the war effort on September 10, 1939; the government deliberately waited after Britain's decision to go to war, partly to demonstrate its independence from Britain and partly to give the country extra time to import arms from the United States as a non-belligerent. War production was ramped up quickly, and was centrally managed through the Department of Munitions and Supply. Unemployment faded away.

Canada became one of the largest trainers of pilots for the Allies through the British Commonwealth Air Training Plan. Many Canadian men joined the war effort, so with them overseas and industries pushing to increase production, women took up positions to aid in the war effort. The hiring of men in many positions in civilian employment was effectively banned later in the war through measures taken under the National Resources Mobilization Act..

Shipyards and repair facilities expanded dramatically as over a thousand warships and cargo vessels were built, along with thousands of auxiliary craft, small boats and others.

Canada expanded food production, but shipped so much to Britain that food rationing had to be imposed. In 1942 it shipped to Britain 25 per cent of total meat production (including 75% of the bacon), 65% of the cheese and 13% of the eggs.

Ethnic minorities from enemy countries
20% of Canada's population were neither of British nor French origin, and their status was of special concern. The main goal was to integrate the marginalized European ethnicities—in contrast to the First World War policy of internment camps for Ukrainians and Germans. In the case of Germany, Italy and especially Japan, the government watched minorities closely for signs of loyalty to their homelands. The fears proved groundless. In February 1942 21,000 Japanese Canadians were rounded up and sent to internment camps that closely resembled similar camps in the US, because the two governments had agreed in 1941 to coordinate their evacuation policies. Most had lived in British Columbia, but in 1945 they were released from detention and allowed to move anywhere in Canada except British Columbia, or they could go to Japan. Most went to the Toronto area.

Women

Canadian women responded to urgent appeals to make do, recycle and salvage in order to come up with needed supplies. They saved fats and grease; gathered recycled goods; handed out information on the best ways to get the most out of recycled goods; and organized many other events to decrease the amount of waste. Volunteer organizations led by women also prepared packages for the military overseas and for prisoners of war in Axis countries.

With World War II came a dire need for employees in the workplace. Without women to step in, the economy would have collapsed. By autumn 1944 there were twice as many women working full-time in Canada's paid labour force as in 1939: between 1.0 and 1.2 million; and this did not include part-time workers or women working on farms." Women had to take on this intensive labour and still find time to make jam, clothes, and undertake other acts of volunteering to aid the men overseas.

Australia

The government greatly expanded its powers in order to better direct the war effort, and Australia's industrial and human resources were focused on supporting the Australian and American armed forces.

Australia entered the war in 1939 and sent its forces to fight the Germans in the Middle East (where they were successful) and Singapore (where they were captured by the Japanese in 1942). By 1943, 37% of the Australian GDP was directed at the war effort. Total war expenditure came to £2,949 million between 1939 and 1945.

The Curtin Labor Government took over in October 1941, and energised the war effort, with rationing of scarce fuel, clothing and some food. When Japan entered the war in December 1941, the danger was at hand, and all women and children were evacuated from Darwin and northern Australia. The Commonwealth Government took control of all income taxation in 1942, which gave it extensive new powers and greatly reduced the states' financial autonomy.

Manufacturing grew rapidly, with the assembly of high performance guns and aircraft a specialty. The number of women working in factories rose from 171,000 to 286,000. The arrival of tens of thousands of Americans was greeted with relief, as they could protect Australia where Britain could not. The US sent in $1.1 billion in Lend Lease, and Australia returned about the same total in services, food, rents and supplies to the Americans.

Three major incidents that took place on Australian territory were the Bombing of Darwin, the attack on Sydney Harbour and the Cowra breakout.

New Zealand

New Zealand, with a population of 1.7 million, including 99,000 Maori, was highly mobilised during the war. The Labour party was in power and promoted unionisation and the welfare state. The armed forces peaked at 157,000 in September 1942; 135,000 served abroad, and 10,100 died. Agriculture expanded, sending record supplies of meat, butter and wool to Britain. When American forces arrived, they were fed as well. The nation spent £574 million on the war, of which 43% came from taxes, 41% from loans and 16% from American Lend Lease. It was an era of prosperity as the national income soared from £158 million in 1937 to £292 million in 1944. Rationing and price controls kept inflation to only 14% during 1939–45.

Montgomerie shows that the war dramatically increased the roles of women, especially married women, in the labour force. Most of them took traditional female jobs. Some replaced men but the changes here were temporary and reversed in 1945. After the war, women left traditional male occupations and many women gave up paid employment to return home. There was no radical change in gender roles but the war intensified occupational trends under way since the 1920s.

India

During World War II, India was a colony of Britain known as British Raj. Britain declared war on behalf of India without consulting with Indian leaders. This resulted in resignation of Congress Ministries.

The British recruited some 2.5 million Indians, who played major roles as soldiers in the Middle East, North Africa and Burma in the British Indian Army. India became the main base for British operations against Japan, and for American efforts to support China.

In Bengal, with an elected Muslim local government under British supervision, the cutoff of rice imports from Burma led to severe food shortages, made worse by maladministration. Prices soared and millions starved because they could not buy food. In the Bengal famine of 1943, three million people died.

An anti-British force of about 40,000 men (and a few women), the Indian National Army (INA) under Subhas Chandra Bose, formed in Southeast Asia. It was under Japanese army control and performed poorly in combat. Its members were captured Indian soldiers from the British Indian Army who gained release from extreme conditions in POW camps by joining the Japanese-sponsored INA. It participated in Battle Of Kohima and Battle of Imphal. In postwar Indian politics, some Indians called them heroes..

The Congress Party in 1942 demanded immediate independence, which Britain rejected. Congress then demanded the British immediately "Quit India" in August 1942, but the Raj responded by immediately jailing tens of thousands of national, state and regional leaders; knocking Congress out of the war. Meanwhile, the Muslim League supported the war effort and gained membership and favors with colonial rulers, as well as British support for its demands for a separate Muslim state (which became Pakistan in 1947).

Hong Kong
Hong Kong was a British colony captured by Japan on December 25, 1941, after 18 days of fierce fighting. The conquest was swift, but was followed by days of large-scale looting; over ten thousand Chinese women were raped or gang-raped by the Japanese soldiers. The population halved, from 1.6 million in 1941 to 750,000 at war's end because of fleeing refugees; they returned in 1945.

The Japanese imprisoned the ruling British colonial elite and sought to win over the local merchant gentry by appointments to advisory councils and neighbourhood watch groups. The policy worked well for Japan and produced extensive collaboration from both the elite and the middle class, with far less terror than in other Chinese cities. Hong Kong was transformed into a Japanese colony, with Japanese businesses replacing the British. The Japanese Empire had severe logistical difficulties and by 1943 the food supply for Hong Kong was problematic.

The overlords became more brutal and corrupt, and the Chinese gentry became disenchanted. With the surrender of Japan the transition back to British rule was smooth, for on the mainland the Nationalist and Communists forces were preparing for a civil war and ignored Hong Kong. In the long run the occupation strengthened the pre-war social and economic order among the Chinese business community by eliminating some conflicts of interests and reducing the prestige and power of the British.

Axis

Germany

Germany had not fully mobilized in 1939, not even in 1941, as society continued in prewar channels. Not until 1943, under Albert Speer (the minister of armaments in the Reich), did Germany finally redirect its entire economy and manpower to war production. Instead of using all available Germans, it brought in millions of slave workers from conquered countries, treating them badly (and getting low productivity in return). Germany's economy was simply too small for a longer all-out war. Hitler's strategy was to change this by a series of surprise blitzkriegs. This failed with defeats in Russia in 1941 and 1942, and against the economic power of the allies.

Forced labour

Instead of expanding the economies of the occupied nations, the Nazis seized the portable machinery and rail cars, requisitioned most of their industrial output, took large quantities of food (15% of French output), and forced the victims to pay for their military occupation.

The Nazis forced 15 million people to work in Germany (including POWs); many died from bad living conditions, mistreatment, malnutrition, and executions. At its peak, forced laborers comprised 20% of the German work force and were a vital part of the German economic exploitation of the conquered territories. They were especially concentrated in munitions and agriculture. For example, 1.5 million French soldiers were kept in POW camps in Germany as hostages and forced workers, and in 1943, 600,000 French civilians were forced to move to Germany to work in war plants.

Economy
Although Germany had about double the population of Britain (80 million versus 46 million), it had to use far more labor to provide food and energy. Britain imported food and employed only a million people (5% of the labour force) on farms, while Germany used 11 million (27%). For Germany to build its twelve synthetic oil plants with a capacity of 3.3 million tons a year it required 2.3 million tons of structural steel and 7.5 million man-days of labor. (Britain imported all its oil from Iraq, Persia and North America). To overcome this problem, Germany employed millions of forced laborers and POWs; by 1944, they had brought in more than five million civilian workers and nearly two million prisoners of war—a total of 7.13 million foreign workers.

Rationing
Rationing in Germany was introduced in 1939 immediately upon the outbreak of hostilities. Hitler was at first convinced that it would affect public support for the war if a strict rationing program was introduced. The Nazis were popular partly because Germany was relatively prosperous, and Hitler did not want to lose popularity or public support. Hitler felt that food and other shortages had been a major factor in destroying civilian morale during World War I, leading to defeatism and surrender.

Despite the rationing, civilians had enough food and clothing; witness Howard K. Smith later wrote that "[f]or a people engaged in a life-and-death war ... the German people for two years of war ate amazingly well." The meat ration, for example, was 500 g per week per person. After the German invasion of the Soviet Union in June 1941, however, this changed to 400 g per week, then fell further. Estimating that the meat ration had dropped by up to 80% in five months of fighting in Russia, and citing many other sudden changes in living conditions, Smith wrote that by the time he left Germany in late 1941, "for the first time ... the German people are undernourished". The system gave extra rations for men involved in heavy industry, and extremely low starvation rations for Jews and Poles in the areas occupied by Germany, but not to the Poles inside Germany, many of whom had been brought in to perform heavy labor in German war industries.

According to a 1997 post by Walter Felscher to the "Memories of the 1940s" electronic mailing list:

The rations were enough to live from, but clearly did not permit luxuries. Whipped cream was unknown from 1939 until 1948, as well as chocolates, cakes with rich creams etc. Meat could not be eaten every day. Other items were not rationed, but simply became unavailable as they had to be imported from overseas: coffee in particular, which throughout was replaced by substitutes made from roasted grains. Vegetables and local fruit were not rationed; imported citrus fruits and bananas were unavailable. In more rural areas, farmers continued to bring their products to the markets, as large cities depended on long distance delivery. Many people kept rabbits for their meat when it became scarce in shops, and it was often a child's job to care for them each day.

By spring 1945, food distribution and the ration system were increasingly in collapse, due to insurmountable transportation disruption and the rapid advance of the Allied armies from west and east with consequent loss of food storage facilities. In Berlin, at the start of the Battle of Berlin, the authorities announced a special supplementary food ration on April 20, 1945. It consisted of a pound (450 g) of bacon or sausage, half a pound of rice, half a pound of peas or pulses, a pound of sugar, four ounces (110 g) of coffee substitute, one ounce of real coffee, and a tin of vegetables or fruit. They also announced that standard food ration allocations for the next fortnight could be claimed in advance. The extra allocation of rations were dubbed by Berliners Himmelfahrtsrationen, Ascension-day rations, "because with these rations we shall now ascend to heaven"

Nursing
Germany had a very large and well organized nursing service, with three main organizations, one for Catholics, one for Protestants, and the DRK (Red Cross). In 1934 the Nazis set up their own nursing unit, the Brown nurses, which absorbed one of the smaller groups, bringing it up to 40,000 members. It set up kindergartens in competition with the other nursing organizations, hoping to seize control of the minds of the younger Germans. Civilian psychiatric nurses who were Nazi party members participated in the killing of invalids, although this was shrouded in euphemisms and denials.

Military nursing was primarily handled by the DRK, which came under partial Nazi control. Frontline medical services were provided by male doctors and medics. Red Cross nurses served widely within the military medical services, staffing the hospitals that perforce were close to the front lines and at risk of bombing attacks. Two dozen were awarded the highly prestigious Iron Cross for heroism under fire. They are among the 470,000 German women who served with the military.

Displaced persons
The conquest of Germany in 1945 freed 11 million foreigners, called "displaced persons" (DPs)- chiefly forced laborers and POWs. In addition to the POWs, the Germans seized 2.8 million Soviet workers to labor in factories in Germany. Returning them home was a high priority for the Allies. However, in the case of Russians and Ukrainians returning often meant suspicion or prison or even death. The UNRRA, Red Cross and military operations provided food, clothing, shelter and assistance in returning home. In all, 5.2 million were repatriated to the Soviet Union, 1.6 million to Poland, 1.5 million to France, and 900,000 to Italy, along with 300,000 to 400,000 each to Yugoslavia, Czechoslovakia, the Netherlands, Hungary, and Belgium.

Refugees
In 1944–45, over 2.5 million ethnic Germans fled from Eastern Europe in family groups, desperately hoping to reach Germany before being overtaken by the Russians. Half a million died in the process, the survivors were herded into refugee camps in East and West Germany for years. Meanwhile, Moscow encouraged its troops to regard German women as targets for revenge. Russian Marshal Georgi Zhukov called on his troops to, "Remember our brothers and sisters, our mothers and fathers, our wives and children tortured to death by Germans....We shall exact a brutal revenge for everything." Upwards of two million women inside Germany were raped in 1945 in a tidal wave of looting, burning and vengeance.

Japan
The Japanese home front was elaborately organized, block by block, with full-scale food rationing and many controls over labor. The government used propaganda heavily and planned in minute detail regarding the mobilization of manpower, identification of critical choke points, food supplies, logistics, air raid shelters, and the evacuation of children and civilians from targeted cities. Food supplies were very tight before the heavy bombing began in fall 1944, then grew to a crisis. There was only a small increase of 1.4 million women entering the labor force between 1940 and 1944. Intense propaganda efforts by the government to promote savings and postpone consumer purchases were largely successful, especially on the part of housewives who generally controlled their family budget. The minister of welfare announced, "In order to secure its labor force, the enemy is drafting women, but in Japan, out of consideration for the family system, we will not draft them."

 The weaknesses in the maximum utilization of womanpower was indicated by the presence of 600,000 domestic servants in wealthy families in 1944. The government wanted to raise the birthrate, even with 8.2 million men in the armed forces, of whom three million were killed. Government incentives helped to raise the marriage rate, but the number of births held steady at about 2.2 million per year, with a 10% decline in 1944–45, and another 15% decline in 1945–46. Strict rationing of milk led to smaller babies. There was little or no long-term impact on the overall demographic profile of Japan.

The government began making evacuation plans in late 1943, and started removing entire schools from industrial cities to the countryside, where they were safe from bombing and had better access to food supplies. In all 1.3 million children were moved—with their teachers but not their parents. When the American bombing began in earnest in late 1944, 10 million people fled the cities to the safety of the countryside, including two-thirds of the residents of the largest cities and 87% of the children. Left behind were the munitions workers and government officials. By April 1945, 87% of the younger children had been moved to the countryside.

Civil defense units were transformed into combat units, especially the Peoples Volunteer Combat Corps, enlisting civilian men up to the age of 60 and women to age 40.  Starting in January 1945 the government operated an intensive training program to enable the entire civilian population to fight the "decisive battle" with the American invaders using grenades, explosive gliders and bamboo spears. Everyone understood they would probably die in what the government called, the "Grand Suicide of the One Hundred Million."
Health conditions became much worse after the surrender in September 1945, with so much housing stock destroyed, and an additional 6.6 million Japanese repatriated from Manchuria, China, Indochina, Formosa, Korea, Saipan and the Philippines.

Civilian Sentiment and Government War Efforts 
There was great civilian support for the war by July 1937. The successful Japanese invasion of Manchuria in the early 1930s fueled the rise of aggressive foreign policy and radical nationalism. The Japanese shimbun's and radio station's reporting of the events helped spread this sentiment quickly. Understanding the benefits of educating the populace about the war efforts, the Japanese government soon followed suite. Starting in January 1938, ten minutes of war news was broadcast at 7:30 PM every day.

At the start of the war, the Home Ministry of Japan established more campaigns to generate support for the war. For instance, citizens were encouraged to avoid luxuries and save wealth for the state. The government even reformed its education system by rewriting ethics textbooks to be more nationalistic and militaristic. Schoolchildren were also taught nationalistic songs such as the Umi Yukaba:

"If I go away to the sea,I shall be a corpse washed up.If I go away to the mountain,I shall be a corpse in the grassBut if I die for the Emperor,It will not be a regret." In 1937, the Shinmin no michi (The Way of the Subjects) was given to all Japanese citizens in order to teach them how they should behave. Similarly, the Japanese war ministry issued the Senjinkun (Field Service Code) in 1941, which tried to educate the soldiers on how to behave during wartime. Specifically, the Senjinkun contained the famous ideal of no-surrender which inspired many Japanese servicemen to commit suicide than risk capture or surrender. Observation of civilian wartime diaries and letters suggest that the government was successful in garnering massive support for the war. Despite the rationing that causes food shortages, many Japanese were happy to oblige. Sakamoto Kane, Kōchi housewife wrote: "For fish, the community council gave us a distribution of only shrimp and swordfish; we can't get either pork or beef. I have the feeling that little by little there will be shortages but that in war, we must aim for frugality even in small ways and we must be careful about waste–for the sake of the country." Such sentiments were very common in Japan.

Further speaking to the success of the Japanese government, there were only ~1000 deserters every year for the six years of World War II. In comparison, ~40,000 Americans and more than 100,000 British servicemen deserted during World War II. While there was some resistance from the Japanese,  most were supportive of the WW II efforts. In fact, many were prepared to fight against the invaders if the opportunity came. In some areas of Japan, women practiced fighting with bamboo spears; girls vowed to kill at least one invader before they died; children practiced throwing balls in anticipation that they would be throwing grenades at the enemy. There were even reports of mass civilian suicides near the end of World War II, an attempt to avoid capture. This was partially due to loyalty for the emperor and fear tactics from the Japanese government, which had spread misinformation that the American soldiers would commit atrocities against innocent civilians. For the other Japanese civilians, there was a general sense of sorrow at the time of Japan's surrender. Inoue Tarō, a Japanese teenager who was tasked with war work, wrote a statement in his diary at the announcement that Japan had surrendered: "Cry! Let's cry until we can't any longer. Later we'll probably see the outpouring of a new power."

*669 is the combined number of deserters and defectors in 1939.

Food
Agricultural production in the home islands held up well during the war until the bombing started. It fell from an index of 110 in 1942 to 84 in 1944 and only 65 in 1945. Worse, imports dried up. The Japanese food rationing system was effective throughout the war, and there were no serious incidences of malnutrition. A government survey in Tokyo showed that in 1944 families depended on the black market for 9% of their rice, 38% of their fish, and 69% of their vegetables.

The Japanese domestic food supply depended upon imports, which were largely cut off by the American submarine and bombing campaigns. Likewise there was little deep sea fishing, so that the fish ration by 1941 was mostly squid harvested from coastal waters. The result was a growing food shortage, especially in the cities. There was some malnutrition but no reported starvation.  Despite government rationing of food, some families were forced to spend more than their monthly income could offer on black market food purchases. They would rely on savings or exchange food for clothes or other possessions.

Deaths
The American aerial bombing of a total of 65 Japanese cities took from 400,000 to 600,000 civilian lives, with 100,000+ in Tokyo alone, over 200,000 in Hiroshima and Nagasaki combined. The Battle of Okinawa resulted in 80,000–150,000 civilian deaths. In addition civilian death among settlers who died attempting to return to Japan from Manchuria in the winter of 1945 were probably around 100,000. The total of Japanese military fatalities between 1937 and 1945 were 2.1 million; most came in the last year of the war and were caused by starvation or severe malnutrition in garrisons cut off from supplies.

Japanese women
According to oral history studied by Thomas Havens, traditional paternalistic norms proved a barrier when the government wanted to exploit woman power more fully for the war effort. Compulsory employment in munitions factories was possible for unmarried women, but social norms prevented married women from doing that sort of work, in sharp contrast to Russia, Britain, Germany and the United States. The absence of so many young men dramatically disrupted long-standing patterns of marriage, fertility, and family life. Severe shortages of ordinary items, including food and housing, were far more oppressive than governmental propaganda efforts. Japanese women obediently followed orders, and there were no serious disruptions such as rioting over food shortages. Forced prostitution for the benefit of Japanese soldiers created the "comfort women" program that proved highly embarrassing to Japan for decades after the war. Non-Japanese women from colonies such as Korea and Formosa were especially vulnerable.

Beginning in the late 20th century cultural historians turned their attention to the role of women in wartime, especially the Second World War. Sources often used include magazines published—by men—for female readers. Typically fictional and nonfictional stories focused on social roles as mothers and wives, especially in dealing with hardships of housing and food supplies, and financial concerns in the absence of men at war. Problems of fashion wartime were a high priority in such magazines in all major countries. Historians report that the Japanese textile and fashion industries were highly successful in adapting to wartime shortages and propaganda needs. Magazines for teenage girls emphasized they must follow patriotic demands that compelled them to give up their adolescent freedoms and transform themselves from "shōjo", which connotes adolescent playfulness, into "gunkoku shōjo" [girls of a military nation], with significant home front responsibilities. Evacuation of women and children from the major cities, out of fear of Allied bombing, was covered in detail to emphasize willingness to sacrifice for patriotism portrayed through fiction, news articles and photographs.  The government controlled all the media, and supervised popular magazines so their content would strategically spread the government's goals and propaganda.

Condition at war's end
Health and living conditions worsened after the surrender in September 1945. Most of the housing stock in large cities was destroyed, just as refugees tried to return from the rural areas. Adding to the crisis there was an influx of 3.5 million returning soldiers and 3.1 million Japanese civilians forcibly repatriated from Imperial outposts in Manchuria, China, Indochina, Formosa, Korea, Saipan and the Philippines; about 400,000 civilians were left behind and not heard of again. Meanwhile, 1.2 million Koreans, POWs and other non-Japanese left Japan. The government implemented pro-natalist policies, which led to an increase in the marriage rate, but birth rates remained steady until they declined by 10% in the stress of the last year of the war, and another 15% during the hardship of the postwar period.

The American bombing campaign of all major cities severely impacted the economy, as did the shortages of oil and raw materials that intensified when Japanese merchant shipping was mostly sunk by American submarines. When industrial production was available to the military, for example, 24 percent of Japan's finished steel in 1937 was allocated to the military, compared to 85 percent in 1945. By the end of the war, output percent of the highest capacity was still 100 percent for steel, although only 75 percent for aluminum, 63 percent for machine tools, 42 percent for vacuum tubes, 54 percent cement, 32 percent cotton fabric, and 36 percent for wool.

Famines
Severe food shortages were common throughout the war zones, especially in Europe where Germany used starvation as a military weapon. Japan did not use it as a deliberate policy, but the breakdown of its transportation and distribution systems led to famine and starvation conditions among its soldiers on many Pacific islands. Bose (1990) studies the three great Asian famines that took place during the war: Bengal in India, Honan in China, and Tonkin in Vietnam. In each famine at least two million people died. They all occurred in densely populated provinces where the subsistence foundations of agriculture was failing under the weight of demographic and market pressures. In each cases famine played a role in undermining the legitimacy of the state and the preexisting social structure.

Housing
A great deal of housing was destroyed or largely damaged during the war, especially in the Soviet Union, Germany, and Japan. In Japan, about a third of the families were homeless at the end of the war. In Germany, about 25% of the total housing stock was destroyed or heavily damaged; in the main cities the proportion was about 45%. Elsewhere in Europe, 22% of the prewar housing in Poland was totally destroyed; 21% in Greece; 9% in Austria, 8% in the Netherlands; 8% in France, 7% in Britain, 5% Italy and 4% in Hungary.

See also

 Economic warfare
 Lotta Svärd, women in Finland
 Military history of the British Commonwealth in the Second World War
 Military production during World War II
 Paper Salvage 1939–50
 Rosie the Riveter
 Squander Bug
 Utility furniture
 Veronica Foster
 Women in World War II

References

Sources
 ATIS, G2, SCAP. "Food Situation" 2 Nov 1945. Asahi, in Press Translations Japan, Social series No. 1, Item 3, pp. 2–3. Japanese newspaper translations
 Baker, J. V. T.  War Economy (1965)
 Barber, John, and Mark Harrison. The Soviet Home Front: A Social and Economic History of the USSR in World War II, Longman, 1991.
 Bessel, Richard. Germany: 1945 (2009)
 Calder, Angus . (1969) The People's War: Britain 1939–45
 Cohen, Jerome (1949). Japan's Economy in War and Reconstruction. University of Minnesota Press. online version.
 Collingham, E. M. The Taste of War: World War Two and the Battle for Food (2011)
 Davies, Norman (2004). Rising '44: The Battle for Warsaw. Viking. .
 Dear, I.C.B. and M. R. D. Foot, eds. The Oxford Companion to World War II (1995)
 Diamond, Hanna. Women and the Second World War in France, 1939–1948: Choices and Constraints (1999)
 Gross, Jan T. Polish Society under German Occupation: The Generalgouvernement, 1939–1944. Princeton UP, 1979.
 Gutman, Israel (1994). Resistance: The Warsaw Ghetto Uprising. Houghton Mifflin. .
 Hancock, W. K. and Gowing, M.M. (1949). British War Economy: History of the Second World War: United Kingdom Civil Series. London: HMSO and Longmans, Green & Co. Available on-line at: British War Economy.
 Harris, Jose. "War and social history: Britain and the home front during the Second World War," Contemporary European History (1992) 1#1 pp 17–35.
 Harrison, Mark (1988). "Resource Mobilization for World War II: The U.S.A., UK, USSR and Germany, 1938–1945". In: Economic History Review, (1988): pp 171–92.
 Havens, Thomas R. Valley of Darkness: The Japanese People and World War II. 1978.
 Hitchcock, William I. The Bitter Road to Freedom: The Human Cost of Allied Victory in World War II Europe (2009)
 Jackson, Julian. France: The Dark Years, 1940–1944 (2003) 660pp online edition
 Kedward, H. R. Occupied France: Collaboration and Resistance (Oxford UP, 1985)
 Nakamura, Takafusa, et al. eds. Economic History of Japan 1914–1955: A Dual Structure (vol 3 2003)
 Overy, Richard. War and Economy in the Third Reich Oxford UP, 1994.
 Pierson, Ruth Roach. They're Still Women After All: The Second World War and Canadian Womanhood (McClelland and Stewart, 1986)
 Postan, Michael (1952). British War Production: History of the Second World War: United Kingdom Civil Series. London: HMSO and Longmans, Green & Co. Available on-line at: British War Production.
  Taylor, Nancy M. The Home Front Volume I  NZ official history (1986); Volume II 
 Thurston, Robert W., and Bernd Bonwetsch, eds. The People's War: Responses to World War II in the Soviet Union (2000)
 Titmuss, Richard M. (1950). Problems of Social Policy: History of the Second World War: United Kingdom Civil Series. London: HMSO and Longmans, Green & Co. Available on-line at: Problems of Social Policy.
 Tooze, Adam. The Wages of Destruction: The Making and Breaking of the Nazi Economy (2008)
 Yamashita, Samuel Hideo. Daily Life in Wartime Japan, 1940-1945 (2015).
 Yust, Walter, ed. 10 Eventful Years: 1937–1946 4 vol. Encyclopædia Britannica, 1947.

Further reading

General
 Beck, Earl R. The European Home Fronts, 1939–1945 Harlan Davidson, 1993, brief survey
 Bohm-Duchen, Monica.  Art and the Second World War  (Princeton University Press; 2014) 288 pages; covers art produced in all the major belligerents
 Costello, John. Love, Sex, and War: Changing Values, 1939–1945 1985. US title: Virtue under Fire: How World War II Changed Our Social and Sexual Attitudes
 Geyer, Michael and Adam Tooze, eds. (2017) The Cambridge History of the Second World War: Volume 3, Total War: Economy, Society and Culture
 Harrison, Mark, ed. The economics of World War II: six great powers in international comparison (Cambridge University Press, 2000). widely cited; covers all the major powers
 Higonnet, Margaret R., et al., eds. Behind the Lines: Gender and the Two World Wars Yale UP, 1987.
 Loyd, E. Lee, ed.; World War II in Europe, Africa, and the Americas, with General Sources: A Handbook of Literature and Research Greenwood Press. 1997. 525pp bibliographic guide
 Loyd, E. Lee, ed.; World War II in Asia and the Pacific and the War's aftermath, with General Themes: A Handbook of Literature and Research Greenwood Press, 1998
 Marwick, Arthur. War and Social Change in the Twentieth Century: A Comparative Study of Britain, France, Germany, Russia, and the United States 1974.
 Mazower, Mark. Hitler's Empire: How the Nazis Ruled Europe (2009)
 Milward, Alan. War, Economy and Society 1977 covers home front of major participants
 Noakes, Jeremy ed., The Civilian in War: The Home Front in Europe, Japan and the U.S.A. in World War II Exeter, UK: University of Exeter, 1992.
 Overy, Richard. The Bombers and the Bombed: Allied Air War Over Europe, 1940–1945 (Viking; 2014) 562 pages; covers the civil defence and the impact on the home fronts of Allied strategic bombing of Germany, Italy, France, the Netherlands, Belgium, Bulgaria, and Scandinavia.
 Toynbee, Arnold, ed. Survey Of International Affairs: Hitler's Europe 1939-1946  (1954) online; detailed coverage
 Wright, Gordon. The Ordeal of Total War 1968., covers all of Europe
 WWII Homefront – Collection of color photographs of the home front during World War II

British Empire
 Jackson, Ashley.  "The British Empire and the First World War"BBC History Magazine 9#11 (2008) online, short essay
 Jackson, Ashley. The British Empire and the Second World War (2007); 604 pages; comprehensive coverage
 Jackson, Ashley, Yasmin Khan, and Gajendra Singh, eds. An Imperial World at War: The British Empire, 1939–45 (2017)  excerpt

Australia
 Hasluck, Paul The Government and the People, 1939–41 (1965) online vol 1; The Government and the People, 1942–45 (1970) online vol 2
 Butlin, S.J.  War Economy, 1939–42 (1955) online
 Butlin, S.J. and C.B. Schedvin, War Economy 1942–1945, (1977) online
 Darian-Smith, Kate. On the Home Front: Melbourne in Wartime, 1939–1945. Australia: Oxford UP, 1990.
 Saunders, Kay. War on the Homefront: State Intervention in Queensland, 1938–1948 (1993)

Canada
 Bray, Bonita. "From Flag-Waving to Pragmatism: Images of Patriotism, Heroes and War in Canadian World War II Propaganda Posters." Material Culture Review/Revue de la culture matérielle (1995) 42#1 online
 Broad, Graham. A Small Price to Pay: Consumer Culture on the Canadian Home Front, 1939–45 (2013)
 Bruce, Jean. Back the attack!: Canadian women during the Second World War, at home and abroad (Macmillan of Canada, 1985)
 Douglas, William Alexander Binny, and Brereton Greenhous, eds. Out of the shadows: Canada in the Second World War (Dundurn, 1995)
 Durflinger, Serge. Fighting from Home: The Second World War in Verdun, Quebec (UBC Press, 2011)
 Granatstein, J. L. Canada's War: The Politics of the Mackenzie King Government. Oxford UP, (1975).
 Granatstein, J. L., and Desmond Morton. A Nation Forged in Fire: Canadians and the Second World War, 1939–1945 (1989).
 Keshen, Jeffrey A. Saints, Sinners, and Soldiers: Canada's Second World War (2004)
 Latta, Ruth. The Memory of All That: Canadian Women Remember World War II. (Burnstown, Ontario: The General Store Publishing House, 1992).
 Perrun, Jody. The Patriotic Consensus: Unity, Morale, and the Second World War in Winnipeg (2014)

India
 Khan, Yasmin. The Raj At War: A People's History Of India's Second World War (2015) a major, comprehensive scholarly study

New Zealand
 Whitfeld, Frederick Lloyd. Political and External Affairs (1958) NZ official history
 Hall, D. O. W. "Women at War," in Episodes & Studies Volume 1 (Historical Publications Branch, Wellington, New Zealand, 1948) pp 1–33 online
 Parsons, Gwen. "The New Zealand Home Front during World War One and World War Two." History Compass 11.6 (2013): 419–428.

United Kingdom
 Braybon, Gail, and Penny Summerfield. (1987) Out of the cage: women's experiences in two world wars
 Calder, Angus. (1969) The People's War: Britain, 1939-1945; a standard scholarly survey. online review
 Field, Geoffrey G. (2011) Blood, Sweat, and Toil: Remaking the British Working Class, 1939-1945 DOI:10.1093/acprof:oso/9780199604111.001.0001 online
 Gardiner, Juliet. (2004) Wartime: Britain 1939–1945 782pp; comprehensive social history
 Hancock, W. K. (1951) Statistical Digest of the War (official History of the Second World War). Online at: Statistical Digest of the War.
 Harris, Carol (2000). Women at War 1939–1945: The Home Front. .
 Marwick, Arthur (1976). The Home Front: The British and the Second World War; heavily illustrated .
 Zweiniger-Bargielowska, Ina. Austerity in Britain: Rationing, Controls & Consumption, 1939–1955 (2000) 286p. online

China
 Coble, Parks M. "China's 'New Remembering' of the Anti-Japanese War of Resistance, 1937–1945," The China Quarterly (2007), 190: 394–410.
 Eastman, Lloyd. Seeds of Destruction: Nationalist China in War and Revolution, 1937–1945. Stanford University Press, 1984
 Fairbank, John, and Albert Feuerwerker, eds., Republican China 1912–1949 in The Cambridge History of China, vol. 13, part 2. Cambridge University Press, 1986.
 Guo Rugui, editor-in-chief Huang Yuzhang,China's Anti-Japanese War Combat Operations Jiangsu People's Publishing House, 2005
 Hsiung, James C., and Steven I. Levine, eds. China's Bitter Victory: The War with Japan, 1937–1945 M. E. Sharpe, 1992
 Hsi-sheng, Ch'i Nationalist China at War: Military Defeats and Political Collapse, 1937–1945 University of Michigan Press, 1982
 Hsu, Long-hsuen and Chang, Ming-kai History of The Sino-Japanese War (1937–1945) 2nd Ed. Chung Wu Publishers.1972
 Lary, Diana. The Chinese People at War: Human Suffering and Social Transformation, 1937–1945 (2010);

France
 Fishman, Sarah, et al. France at War: Vichy and the Historians online 360 pp
 Gildea, Robert (2002). Marianne in Chains: In Search of the German Occupation 1940–1945. London: Macmillan. 
 Gordon, B., ed. Historical Dictionary of World War Two France: The Occupation, Vichy and the Resistance, 1938–1946 (1998)
 Hall, W.-D. The Youth of Vichy France (Oxford, 1981).
 Simon Kitson's Vichy webpage articles, document & excerpts; extensive coverage edited by British scholar
 Paxton, Robert O. Vichy France 1940–1944: Old Guard and New Order, 1940– 1944 (2nd ed. 2001)

Germany
 Biddiscombe, Perry "Into the Maelstrom: German Women in Combat, 1944–45," War & Society (2011) 30:61–89
 Brodie, Thomas.  "German Society at War, 1939–45." Contemporary European History 27.3 (2018): 500-516
DOI: https://doi.org/10.1017/S0960777318000255
 Burleigh, Michael. The Third Reich: A New History (2000)
 Echternkamp, Jörg. ed. Germany and the Second World War Volume IX/I: German Wartime Society 1939–1945: Politicization, Disintegration, and the Struggle for Survival (2008)
 Evans, Richard J. The Third Reich at War (2010)
 Hagemann, Karen and Stefanie Schüler-Springorum; Home/Front: The Military, War, and Gender in Twentieth-Century Germany Berg, 2002
 Hagemann, Karen. "Mobilizing Women for War: The History, Historiography, and Memory of German Women's War Service in the Two World Wars," Journal of Military History (2011) 75:1055–1093.
 Kalder N. "The German War Economy". Review of Economic Studies 13 (1946): 33–52. in JSTOR
 Klemperer, Victor. I Will Bear Witness 1942–1945: A Diary of the Nazi Years (2001), memoir by partly Jewish professor
 Milward, Alan. The German Economy at War 1965.
 Owings, Alison ed. Frauen: German Women Recall the Third Reich (1995); primary source
 Speer, Albert. Inside the Third Reich: Memoirs 1970; primary source on the economy by a key decision-maker
 Steinert, Marlis G. Hitler's war and the Germans: Public Mood and Attitude during the Second World War (1977).
 Stephenson, Jill. Hitler's Home Front: Wurttemberg under the Nazis (2006).

Greece
 Iatrides, John O., ed. Greece in the 1940s: A Nation In Crisis (1981)
 Mazower, Mark.  After the War Was Over: Reconstructing the Family, Nation and State in Greece, 1943–1960 (2000)
 Sweet-Escott, Bickham. Greece: A Political and Economic Survey, 1939–1953 (1954)

Italy
 Bosworth, R. J. B.  Mussolini's Italy: Life Under the Fascist Dictatorship, 1915–1945 (2007)
 De Grazia, Victoria. How Fascism Ruled Women: Italy, 1922–1945 (1993)
 Tracy Koon, Believe, Obey, Fight: Political Socialization in Fascist Italy 1922–1943 (U North Carolina Press, 1985),
 Morgan, D. Italian Fascism, 1919–1945 (1995).
 Wilhelm, Maria de Blasio. The Other Italy: Italian Resistance in World War II. W. W. Norton, 1988. 272 pp.
 Williams, Isobel. Allies and Italians under Occupation: Sicily and Southern Italy, 1943-45 (Palgrave Macmillan, 2013). xiv + 308 pp. online review
 Willson, Perry. "Empire, Gender and the 'Home Front' in Fascist Italy." Women's History Review 16#4 (2007): 487–500.

Japan
 Cook, Haruko Taya, and Theodore Cook. Japan at War: An Oral History (1992), interviews.
 Dower, John. Japan in War and Peace 1993.
 Duus, Peter, Ramon H. Myers, and Mark R. Peattie. The Japanese Wartime Empire, 1931–1945. Princeton UP 1996. 375p.
 Havens, Thomas R. "Women and War in Japan, 1937–1945." American Historical Review 80 (1975): 913–934. online in JSTOR
 Perez, Louis G., ed. Japan at War: An Encyclopedia (2013) pp 477–98  excerpts and text search
 Yoshimi, Yoshiaki. Grassroots Fascism: The War Experience of the Japanese People (Columbia UP, 2015). 360 pp. online review

Low Countries
 Geller, Jay Howard. "The Role of Military Administration in German-occupied Belgium, 1940–1944," Journal of Military History, January 1999, Vol. 63 Issue 1, pp 99–125,
 Sellin, Thorsten, ed. "The Netherlands during German Occupation," Annals of the American Academy of Political and Social Science Vol. 245, May 1946 pp i to 180 in JSTOR, 21 essays by experts
 Van Der Wee, Herman, and Monique Verbreyt. A Small Nation in the Turmoil of the Second World War: Money, Finance and Occupation (2010), on Belgium
 Warmbrunn, Werner. The Dutch under German Occupation 1940–1945 (Stanford U.P. 1963)
 Wouters, Nico. "Municipal Government during the Occupation (1940–5): A Comparative Model of Belgium, the Netherlands and France," European History Quarterly, April 2006, Vol. 36 Issue 2, pp 221–246

Philippines
 Agoncillo Teodoro A. The Fateful Years: Japan's Adventure in the Philippines, 1941–1945. Quezon City, PI: R.P. Garcia Publishing Co., 1965. 2 vols
 Hartendorp A. V.H. The Japanese Occupation of the Philippines. Manila: Bookmark, 1967. 2 vols.
 Lear, Elmer. The Japanese Occupation of the Philippines: Leyte, 1941–1945. Southeast Asia Program, Department of Far Eastern Studies, Cornell University, 1961. 246p. emphasis on social history
 Steinberg, David J. Philippine Collaboration in World War II. University of Michigan Press, 1967. 235p.

Poland
 Chodakiewicz, Marek Jan. Between Nazis and Soviets: Occupation Politics in Poland, 1939–1947 (Lexington Books, 2004)
 Coutouvidi, John, and Jaime Reynold. Poland, 1939–1947 (1986)
 Gross, Jan T. Revolution from Abroad: The Soviet Conquest of Poland's Western Ukraine and Western Belorussia (1988).
 Kochanski, Halik. The Eagle Unbowed: Poland and the Poles in the Second World War (2012)         excerpt and text search
 Redlich, Shimon. Together and Apart in Brzezany: Poles, Jews, and Ukrainians, 1919–1945. Indiana U. Press, 2002. 202 pp.
 Wrobel, Piotr. "The Devil's Playground: Poland in World War II' (The Canadian Foundation for Polish Studies of the Polish Institute of Arts & Sciences, online)
 "Poland At War 1939–1945 Resources", English bibliography

Scandinavia
 Andenaes, Johs, et al. Norway and the Second World War Oslo: Johan Grundt Tanum Forlag, 1966.
 Kinnunen, Tiina, and Ville Kivimäki. Finland in World War II: History, Memory, Interpretations (2011)
 Nissen, Henrik S. Scandinavia During the Second World War (1983)
 Salmon; Patrick, ed. Britain and Norway in the Second World War London: HMSO, 1995.

Soviet Union
 Berkhoff, Karel C. Harvest of Despair: Life and Death in Ukraine Under Nazi Rule. Harvard U. Press, 2004. 448 pp.
 Berkhoff, Karel C. Motherland in Danger: Soviet Propaganda during World War II (2012) excerpt and text search covers both propaganda and reality of home front conditions
 Braithwaite, Rodric. Moscow 1941: A City and Its People at War (2006)
 Dallin, Alexander. Odessa, 1941–1944: A Case Study of Soviet Territory under Foreign Rule. Portland: Int. Specialized Book Service, 1998. 296 pp.
  Kucherenko, Olga. Little Soldiers: How Soviet Children Went to War, 1941–1945 (2011)  excerpt and text search
 Overy, Richard. Russia's War: A History of the Soviet Effort: 1941–1945 (1998) 432pp excerpt and txt search
 Vallin, Jacques; Meslé, France; Adamets, Serguei; and Pyrozhkov, Serhii. "A New Estimate of Ukrainian Population Losses During the Crises of the 1930s and 1940s." Population Studies (2002) 56(3): 249–264. in JSTOR Reports life expectancy at birth fell to a level as low as ten years for females and seven for males in 1933 and plateaued around 25 for females and 15 for males in the period 1941–44.

 
Japan in World War II
 
Germany in World War II
United States home front during World War II
Poland in World War II